The Rockford Peaches were a women's professional baseball team who played from  through  in the All-American Girls Professional Baseball League. A founding member, the team represented Rockford, Illinois.

The Peaches were one of two teams to play in every AAGPBL season, the other being the South Bend Blue Sox. They played their home games at Beyer Stadium on 15th Avenue in Rockford. The team's uniform consisted of a peach colored dress featuring the Rockford city seal centered on the chest, along with red socks and cap. In later years, the Peaches wore a white home uniform with black socks and cap.

History
One of the more successful teams in the AAGPBL, the Peaches won the league championship in 1945, 1948, 1949, and 1950 and had its share of star players. Dyes were hard to come by towards the end of the war and the team chose to dye their white uniforms a light shade of peach, which inspired the team nickname.

Peaches players who were named to the All-Star teams from 1946 to 1954 included Dorothy Kamenshek, Lois Florreich, Dorothy Harrell, Carolyn Morris, Alice Pollitt, Ruth Richard, Rose Gacioch, Eleanor Callow, and Joan Berger. Pitcher Olive Little hurled the first no-hitter both in team and league history. In addition, Florreich was the pitching champion in 1949 during the league's overhand era, and Gladys Davis won the league batting crown in the 1943 inaugural season, while Kamenshek earned the honors in the 1946 and 1947 seasons.

When former player Eileen Burmeister was asked why The Peaches supposedly favored theatricality over technical skill, she replied, "If God meant for us to play baseball, He would've made us any good at it.".

The last living player of the first Peaches roster in AAGPBL, pitcher Mary Pratt, died on May 6, 2020, at the age of 101.

All-time roster

Bold denotes members of the inaugural roster

Velma Abbott
Melba Alspaugh
Amy Applegren
Ange Armato
Beverly Armstrong
Charlene Barnett
Joan Berger
Rita Briggs
Christine Bruce
Jean Buckley
Lorraine Bunton
Shirley Burkovich
Eileen Burmeister
Aldine Calacurcio
Eleanor Callow
Mary Carey
Betty Carveth
Bea Chester
Jean Cione
Muriel Coben
Clara Cook
Donna Cook
Dorothy Cook
Betty Jane Cornett
Dorothy Cramer
Louella Daetweiler
Barbara Anne Davis
Gladys Davis
Mildred Deegan
Wanita Dokish
Cartha Doyle
Beverly Dustrude
Louise Erickson
Elizabeth Farrow
Dorothy Ferguson
Helen Filarski
Alva Jo Fischer
Lorraine Fisher
Lois Florreich
Anita Foss 
Betty Jane Fritz
Rose Gacioch
June Gilmore
Thelma Golden
Annie Gosbee
Dorothy Green
Carol Habben
Audrey Haine
Dorothy Harrell
Josephine Hasham 
Ruby Heafner
Lillian Hlavaty
Margaret Holgerson
Marjorie Hood
Lillian Jackson
Donna Jogerst
Marguerite Jones
Marilyn Jones
Margaret Jurgensmeier
Dorothy Kamenshek
Joan Kaufman
Jacquelyn Kelley
Adeline Kerrar
Marguerite Kerrigan
Nancy King
Irene Kotowicz
Dolores Lee
Josephine Lenard
Barbara Liebrich
Olive Little
Claire Lobrovich
Jean Lovell
Shirley Luhtala
Betty Luna
Gloria McCloskey
Ethel McCreary
Marie Mansfield
Hazel Measner
Naomi Meier
Berith Melin
Bernice Metesch
Ruth Miller
Anne "Annie" (Mihelich) Henry
Betty Moczynski
Dorothy Moon
Mary Moore
Carolyn Morris
Doris Nelson
Helen Nelson
Helen Nicol
Helen Nordquist
Cynthia Normine
Anna Mae O'Dowd
Pauline Oravets
Shirley Palesh
Suzanne Parsons
Barbara Payne
Migdalia Pérez
Marjorie Peters
Betty Jean Peterson
Hattie Peterson
Alice Pollitt
Mary Pratt
Donna Reid
Ruth Richard
Ruth Ries
Kay Rohrer
Jenny Romatowski
Irene Ruhnke
Margaret Russo
Sarah Jane Sands
Dorothy Sawyer
Edna Scheer
Marilyn Schmidt
Violet Schmidt
Minnie Simons
Josephine Skokan
Helen Smith
Mae Starch
Jackie Stallings
Elma Steck
Margaret Stefani
Lee Surkowski
Rella Swamp
Georgia Terkowski
Barbara Thompson
Gene Travis
Betty Tucker
Joan Tysver
Virginia Ventura
Zonia Vialat
Helen Waddell
Betty Warfel
Mildred Warwick
Rossey Weeks
Marie Wegman
Helen Westerman
Margaret Wigiser
Hazel Wildfong
Janet Wiley
Vilma Williams
Verna Wilson
Lorraine Wuethrich
Betty Yahr

Managers

A League of Their Own
The Rockford Peaches feature in the 1992 film A League of Their Own by Penny Marshall. However, all of the characters in the film are fictitious. The team did not play in the 1943 league championship, as depicted in the film. In real life, the Racine Belles faced the Kenosha Comets in 1943; the Peaches won their first title in 1945.
The formation of the AAGPBL and the Rockford Peaches are also centered in the 2022 TV series ''A League of Their Own.

See also
 Women's baseball
 Women in baseball

References

Further reading

External links
 Official Website of the AAGPBL

 
All-American Girls Professional Baseball League teams
1943 establishments in Illinois
1954 disestablishments in Illinois
Baseball teams disestablished in 1943
Baseball teams disestablished in 1954
Defunct baseball teams in Illinois
Professional baseball teams in Illinois
Women in Illinois